David Gil Mohedano (born 11 January 1994) is a Spanish professional footballer who plays for Cádiz CF as a goalkeeper.

Club career
Born in Madrid, Gil was an Atlético Madrid youth graduate. He made his senior debut in the 2012–13 season, playing ten games for the C-team in Tercera División. After being promoted to the reserves in 2013, he also featured in the first team's pre-season in July 2014.

On 15 July 2015 Gil moved to another reserve team, Getafe CF B in Segunda División B. On 17 July 2017, he joined Cádiz CF, being initially assigned to the B-team in the fourth division.

On 24 August 2018, Gil signed a contract extension until 2020 and was definitely promoted to the Andalusians' main squad in Segunda División. He made his professional debut on 12 September, starting in a 2–1 away win against CD Tenerife, for the season's Copa del Rey.

Gil made his Segunda División debut on 17 September 2019, starting in a 3–0 loss at AD Alcorcón, and spent the campaign as a backup to longtime incumbent Alberto Cifuentes as his side achieved promotion to La Liga. He made his debut in the top tier on 12 September 2020, starting in a 2–0 home loss against CA Osasuna.

Career statistics

References

External links

1994 births
Living people
Footballers from Madrid
Spanish footballers
Association football goalkeepers
La Liga players
Segunda División players
Segunda División B players
Tercera División players
Atlético Madrid C players
Atlético Madrid B players
Getafe CF B players
Cádiz CF players